The Ministry of Relations with the Parliament of Romania was one of the ministries of the Government of Romania.

The Ministry was dissolved on 23 December 2009.

External links
 GUV.ro

Relations with the Parliament